is a commercial and entertainment area in Kitazawa, Setagaya, Tokyo. It is located in the southwestern corner of the Kitazawa district, hence the name "Shimo-kitazawa" (literally lower Kitazawa). Also known as "Shimokita", the neighbourhood is well known for the density of small independent fashion retailers, cafes, theaters, bars and live music venues.

Independent retail
The neighbourhood is often compared with the backstreets of Ura-Harajuku and Koenji; smaller shop units and restricted vehicular access has limited its appeal to larger domestic and international fashion merchandisers, enabling independent retailers to survive. The district consists of the streets immediately surrounding Shimo-Kitazawa Station, where the Odakyu Electric Railway and Keio Inokashira Lines intersect. The neighbourhood has long been a center for stage theater and live music venues; serves as a home to the historic Honda Gekijō theater and holds theatre festivals throughout the year. With numerous cafes, secondhand and vintage fashion and recorded music outlets, Shimokitazawa remains popular with students and followers of Japanese youth subcultures.

Redevelopment
In 2004, the Setagaya City Council released a plan to redevelop a large section of the city, including the construction of several high rise buildings, and extending Route 54 across the city. The streets are very narrow and highly intersected, with many small alleyways. Because many residents and visitors consider this to be part of the charm of Shimokitazawa, some controversy surrounds the development plan, which some saw as degrading and crassly commercialized. 

With the relocation of the Odakyu Line rail tracks underground in March 2013, new station entrances, along with fully doubled tracks in both directions, larger scale redevelopment of the immediate Shimo-Kitazawa Station area is ongoing and the infamous Odakyu rush hour crunch has been reduced to 150% of train load as of 2018 from nearly 200% previously.

References

External links
 
 Shimokitazawa (JNTO)
 Go Tokyo Travel Guide
 Shimokitazawa Music Festival (Japanese)

Neighborhoods of Tokyo
Setagaya